This is a list of episodes for The Daily Show with Trevor Noah in 2017.

2017

January

February

March

April

May

June

July

August

September

October

November

December

References

 
Daily Show
Daily Show guests